Luis Gerardo Hernández Méndez (born 12 March 1982) is a Mexican actor and producer born in Aguascalientes City. Having previously mostly appeared in smaller films and on television, Méndez shot to fame with his starring role in the 2013 comedy film The Noble Family, which for a few months was Mexico's highest-ever grossing film. The following year, he played a role in the movie Cantinflas, and as of 2015, he co-produced (with friend Gary Alazraki) and co-starred (with Mariana Treviño) in Club de Cuervos, which is Netflix's first ever original production in Spanish. More recently, his production company Cine Vaquero had a first look deal with ViacomCBS International Studios.

Early life and education
Méndez was born and raised in Aguascalientes in  central Mexico.

Personal life
Méndez was asked about his sexuality following an interview where he used a masculine form to refer to his past relationships. As of January 2016, he was in a relationship with Pablo Chemor.

Méndez has a dog named Tuba, and they both appeared in a PETA campaign encouraging people to treat their pets as members of the family.

Awards and nominations 
For his role as Javi Noble in The Noble Family (2013), Méndez was nominated for the Ariel Award for Best Actor. He won a New York Latin ACE Awards for Best Supporting Actor in a Motion Picture for his role in Cantinflas (2014). In 2019, Méndez received a second Ariel Award nomination for Best Actor for his lead role in Bayoneta.

Filmography

Film

Television

References

External links 

Living people
1982 births
Mexican male telenovela actors
Mexican male film actors
Male actors from Aguascalientes
People from Aguascalientes City
21st-century Mexican male actors
Mexican LGBT actors